The Galician Republic was a European state. The republic was an ephemeral passage in the history of Galicia. It lasted only a few hours on 27 June 1931, a day ahead of the election to the Second Spanish Republic's Constitutional Assembly. On that date, left-nationalist leaders Pedro Campos Couceiro and Antón Alonso Ríos declared that full independence from Spain was the only way for Galicia to overcome its secular backwardness and to regain its national dignity. The temporary cancellation of railway construction connecting Zamora with Ourense was the immediate trigger of the events; however, the historic marginalization of the country – then overwhelmingly rural and Galician-speaking – was at the core of the movement, which negotiations between Spanish forces and the Galician instigators eventually defused. A number of leftist organizations and champions of Galician national sovereignty still celebrate the date.

See also 
 Galicia
 Galician nationalism

External links 
 79 anos despois, artigo aparecido no xornal Galicia Hoxe o 20 de xuño de 2010.
 27 de xuño de 1931: Proclámase a República Galega, reportaxe aparecida no xornal dixital Vieiros o 22 de xuño de 2010.

History of Galicia (Spain)
Galician nationalism
States and territories disestablished in 1931
States and territories established in 1931
1931 in Spain
Galicia, Republic of
Galicia
Former countries of the interwar period